The Harvard Boxing Club is a student organization at Harvard University in Cambridge, Massachusetts.

History
Boxing has been a popular campus activity since the late 19th century.  In the intramural tournament of 1879, future President Theodore Roosevelt faced C.S. Hanks in the lightweight championship and lost, after a controversial late hit by Hanks. According to historian Edmund Morris, the crowd started booing Hanks, prompting Roosevelt to put up his hands and shout “It's alright, he didn’t hear [the bell]”. When Roosevelt campaigned for the Presidency, his supporters would frequently recall this anecdote as an early example of his extraordinary character.

Boxing became an official varsity sport in 1922, per recommendation of the Harvard Athletic Committee, and Harvard boxers performed well against their Ivy League opponents (amassing a 25:11:4 record from 1930 to 1937).  The team expanded during World War II, when all undergraduates were required to participate in intercollegiate boxing training as a way of improving wartime fitness.

In 1961, the NCAA decided to discontinue boxing as an intercollegiate sport and the Harvard Boxing Team was replaced by the Harvard Boxing Club. Intramural tournaments continued until 1976 when Harvard banned them due to riotous crowd attendance, leaving the Harvard Boxing Club (in its current form) as the last remnant of the college’s proud boxing tradition.

Notable coaches include Tommy Rawson, national amateur junior lightweight champion in 1929, who coached boxers such as Rocky Marciano, and coached at Harvard for 60 years from 1941-2001.

Today
The Harvard Boxing Club currently includes several dozen members, many of whom participate in the annual Harvard Boxing Club Exhibition Night (a tradition that was revived in 2009). The Club is now co-ed (since the merging of Harvard and Radcliffe College) and includes both undergraduates and graduates.

The Harvard Boxing Club is managed by one undergraduate President and four undergraduate Captains.  The Harvard Boxing Club is coached by former title-holding amateur fighter, Doug Yoffe, who assumed the position in 2001. Yoffe replaced Tommy Rawson—former national amateur lightweight champion (with a 223-4 amateur record), former chairman of the Massachusetts Boxing Commission, and one-time trainer of boxing legend Rocky Marciano. Rawson had been “Coach” since 1941.

The Club practices two hours per day, six days per week. Skill days (Monday, Wednesday, Friday) are typically led by the Coach, while conditioning days (Tuesday, Thursday, Saturday) are typically led by the Captains.

Notable members
 Theodore Roosevelt, 26th President of the United States, Medal of Honor, Nobel Peace Prize
 John F. Kennedy, 35th President of the United States
 Thomas Mesereau, legal counsel for Michael Jackson in 2005 child molestation trial
 Fred Joseph, CEO of Drexel Burnham Lambert (HBC 1959)
 Gerard Leone, District Attorney of Middlesex County, Massachusetts
 Alan Jay Lerner, lyricist, winner of three Tony Awards and three Academy Awards
 Joy Liu, winner of the New England Golden Gloves (Women’s Lightweight Novice Division) (HBC 1999)
 Alex Angarita, contestant on Survivor: Fiji (HBC 2003)
 Rosalie Parker, US Amateur Women's Flyweight Champion 
 Patrick Rettig, winner of the Greater Lowell Golden Gloves (Men’s Heavyweight Novice Division) (HBC 2000)
 Sam Sheridan, author of A Fighter’s Heart—One Man’s Journey Through the World of Fighting
 Matthew Ross, film director and screenwriter
 Matt Saha, actor and author
 Norman Mailer, Pulitzer-Prize winning author of The Armies of the Night and The Executioner's Song
 Regan Coleman, tech entrepreneur (HBC 1986)
 Anthony Braga, Professor of Criminology at University of Pennsylvania (HBC 1999)
 Michelle Rhee, Chancellor of D.C. Public Schools, Founder of StudentsFirst (HBC 1999)
 Tamsin Jones, Lecturer on Religion at Harvard University (HBC 1999)

See also
Oxford University Amateur Boxing Club
Cambridge University Amateur Boxing Club

References

External links
 

Sport at Harvard University
College boxing teams in the United States
Boxing clubs in the United States
1961 establishments in Massachusetts
Boxing in Massachusetts